Omodei is a surname. Notable people with the surname include:

Luigi Omodei (1607–1685), Italian Catholic cardinal
Luigi Omodei (1657–1706), Italian Catholic cardinal, nephew of Luigi Omodei (1607–1685)
Paul Omodei (born 1950), Australian politician

See also
Amodei

Italian-language surnames